Southland Publishing, Inc. is a publishing company based in Pasadena, California with five offices in Southern California (Downtown Los Angeles, Ventura County, Santa Monica, Pasadena, and San Diego). The company produces weekly newspapers, monthly magazines, direct mail products, and affiliated websites throughout California and selected states throughout the U.S.

Publications

Alternative weeklies
Pasadena Weekly
 San Diego CityBeat 
 Ventura County Reporter

Community weekly
The Argonaut
Los Angeles Downtown News

Monthly magazines
 Arroyo Monthly
 Culture Magazine (sold Fall 2018)
 Ventana Monthly

Direct Mail monthly 
 Ventura Direct

History
Southland Publishing, Inc. was founded in 1998 converting from the former name Ventura Newspaper, Inc. This was done to reflect the vision of building a multi-media company throughout Southern California.  Southland Publishing was named and spearheaded by David Comden, its first Group Publisher.  The vision was to develop a group of newsweeklies that covered Southern California (the Southland)which were similar in concept but unique to each market served.

Southland Publishing grew to have a collective of newsweeklies, magazines and direct mail publications, all printed by Valley business Printers in Sylmar, CA.  

The first publication for Southland was the Ventura County Reporter, a newsweekly serving Ventura County, California. In January 2001, Southland purchased the Pasadena Weekly in 2001 from Tribune Company (then owners of the Los Angeles Times). Southland Publishing then purchased SLAMM magazine, a music biweekly, from publisher Kevin Hellman in 2002, changing the name to San Diego CityBeat. 

Southland then purchased the "Inland Empire Weekly" ("IE Weekly"), another newsweekly serving the San Bernardino and Riverside Counties (The Inland Empire)founded by Jeremy Jachary.

Southland then purchased The Argonaut in 2013. The Argonaut, founded in 1971, was initially focused on the new Marina del Rey and has since expanded its coverage to include West Los Angeles: Santa Monica, Venice, Playa Vista, Playa del Rey, Westchester, and Marina del Rey.  In 2017, Southland purchased the Los Angeles Downtown News from Sue Laris, who founded the publication in 1972.

Los Angeles Downtown News
The Los Angeles Downtown News was launched to serve the downtown commuter crowd of the 1970s. Since that time, Downtown Los Angeles has blossomed into a 24/7 live-work urban city with thousands of hotel rooms and condos built to accommodate the workforce.  In addition, the area is now home to world class entertainment facilities, museums, and restaurants.

Pasadena Weekly
Pasadena Weekly was launched in 1984 and it covers community news on Pasadena, such as city government, public safety, and events, along with opinion, arts, entertainment and dining listings, and an 8-days listing with events scheduled for the Pasadena community. It is published on Thursdays and it is available only on newsstands located in the downtown area for free. It also publishes "Happy Birthday, Pasadena" to celebrate the city's anniversary of incorporation in June, the "Best of Pasadena" edition in October, and a "Welcome Pasadena" edition in December during Christmas involving the Rose Parade.

San Diego CityBeat
San Diego CityBeat (formerly SLAMM magazine) was bought by Southland in 2002, which converted it into an alternative newsweekly seeking to target young, educated readers in San Diego, an audience whose needs, Southland's owners felt, were not being met by the other two major publications in San Diego, The San Diego Union-Tribune and the San Diego Reader.

Ventura County Reporter
The Ventura County Reporter was founded in 1976 in Oxnard, California. Purchased from Nancy Cloutier in 1997, the paper was then known as the Ventura County & Coast Reporter, officed in the Ventura Harbor Village. The weekly was renamed the Ventura County Reporter (also known as the '’VC Reporter on its website) and David Comden was brought in to be publisher in 1998. The VC Reporter'' is now located at 700 E. Main Street in downtown Ventura.

Among the magazines under the Southland banner were:  "Arroyo Monthly" serving the San Gabriel Valley, "Ventana Monthly"
which is the magazine of the Pasadena area, "Playa Vista Direct" focusing on the Playa Vista area of Los Angeles, "Culture Magazine", one of the leading publications for the Cannabis culture.  Culture was sold to "High Times Holdings" in 2018.'

Southland Publishing, inc. was sold in July 2019 to Times Media Group.

References

External links
Corporate website

Weekly newspaper companies of the United States
Magazine publishing companies of the United States